Lygephila alaica is a moth of the family Erebidae first described by  in 1983. It is found in Tajikistan and Uzbekistan.

References

Moths described in 1983
Toxocampina